The 1991 Women's Rugby World Cup was the first Women's Rugby World Cup. The tournament was not approved by the International Rugby Board (IRB), yet it still went ahead despite the disapproval of the sports governing body. France confirmed their participation only minutes before the draw was made on 26 February. Representatives of the IRB, WRFU and RFU attended the final, but it was not until 2009 that the IRB officially endorsed the event as a "world cup" when it published, for the first time, a list of previous winners in a press release.

The tournament was held in and around Cardiff, Wales. Twelve teams competed for the trophy, divided into four pools of three teams each. Each team played three pool matches on 6 April, 8 April, and 10 April, and the semifinals were on 12 April and 14 April, respectively. This meant that the championship teams played five matches over nine days, with only one day rest between matches.

The tournament champions were the United States who defeated England 19–6 in the final at Cardiff Arms Park before almost 3,000 fans. The teams that failed to qualify for the semi-finals took part in a "plate" tournament between the 11 and 13 April.

Organisation
The tournament was created and largely organised by four women who were with the Richmond Women's Rugby Club – Deborah Griffin, Sue Dorrington, Alice Cooper, and Mary Forsyth.

The International Rugby Board decided not to sanction or support the tournament. The tournament was run on a very small and tightly controlled budget. The organisers considered a number of host cities, and chose Cardiff, Wales for several reasons — because most of the teams were European it made sense to hold the tournament in Europe; the organisers were looking for a strong rugby community, which Wales possessed; and Cardiff offered help, including paying for the welcome ceremony and closing dinner.

The tournament made a financial loss. Due in some part to the fact that the men's 1991 Rugby World Cup was also being held in Europe that year, with some matches staged in Wales,  the women's tournament experienced disappointing attendance revenues and the failure to attract television contracts or sponsorship. Another financial drain was due to the Soviet Union team being unable to pay its hotel and transport bills, as Soviets were not permitted to leave the country with hard currency. The team had hoped to survive by bartering and selling goods such as vodka and trinkets such as Russian dolls; these activities were curtailed after they aroused the attention of HM Customs and Excise, and the Soviets relied on contributions by local Cardiff businesses to survive.

The financial loss was made good. Anonymous businessmen pledged at the post-tournament celebratory dinner to make up a portion of the deficit. The English Rugby Football Union made good on the remainder of the deficit.

Teams

The organizers invited multiple rugby unions to participate, and 12 nations confirmed their participation. The teams had varying degrees of international experience. Among the more experienced teams were the Netherlands with 20 caps and France with 18 caps, dating back to their first meeting in 1982. Among the lesser experienced teams were Japan with no prior caps, and Spain with 1 prior cap from a 1989 0–28 drubbing by the French.

Match Officials

Pool stages

Pool 1

Pool 2

Pool 3

Pool 4

Plate

Plate quarter-finals

Plate semi-finals

Plate final

Cup

Semi-finals

Third place playoff
Officially, third place was shared between France and New Zealand.

However, a match between a French and a New Zealand XV did take place on 14 April, France winning 3–0. But it is clear from records held by the RFU Rugby Museum that game was not scheduled as part of the tournament and is not included in any official tournament records after the event.

Participants record that New Zealand fielded a weakened team based around players who had not made many appearances in the tournament. New Zealand awarded no caps – indeed the game does not appear in any official Black Fern records. On the other hand, the French RFU have included the game in a recently published official  list of internationals, and do appear  to have awarded caps.

As status of the game is disputed it is also not currently accepted as being a test match.

Final

Organisers
 Deborah Griffin — Chair
 Sue Dorrington — Commercial manager
 Alice Cooper  — Press and PR
 Mary Forsyth — Financial director

See also
 Women's Rugby World Cup
 Rugby World Cup (men's)
 1991 Rugby World Cup (men's)
 Rugby World Cup Sevens

References

External links
 US Women Eagles Win the Inaugural Women's World Cup 

 
1991
1991 rugby union tournaments for national teams
1990–91 in Welsh rugby union
International women's rugby union competitions hosted by Wales
1991 in women's rugby union
April 1991 sports events in Europe
1991 in Welsh women's sport